Llangollen Town F.C. is a Welsh football club based in Llangollen playing in the Ardal NE. They were founded in 1908.

History
The club joined the newly formed North East Wales Football League in 2020 as a Premier Division club.

Honours
 1968 League Champions
 1972 League Champions
 1974 North East Wales FA Challenge Cup Winners
 1985 Division Three Champions (Reserves)
 1986 League Champions
 1996 North East Wales FA Junior (Horace Wynne) Cup Winners
 1996 Division One League Cup Winners
 2006 Premier League Cup Winners
 2009 League Champions and President Cup Winners

Current squad
1. Ricky Bennett (gk)
2. Darnell Prescott
3. Jack Maybury
4. Jack Goulbourn
5. Ben Realey
6. Gwilym Keddie
7. Luke Riley
8. Kristian Jones (c)
9. Benjamin Wilson
10. Daniel Weir
11. Jake Heyward
12. Ryan Harden
13. Huw Penge
14. Daniel Bevan
15. Lewis George
16. Tom Pemberton
17. Nathan Jones
18. Jacque Coates
19. Rupeni Thorne
20. George Roberts
21. Meuryn Hughes
22. Joe Morris

Other Info
Not to be confused with Llangollen F.C.

References

External links
 Official Website

Football clubs in Wales
Association football clubs established in 1908
Llangollen
Welsh National League (Wrexham Area) Premier Division clubs
1908 establishments in Wales
Cymru Alliance clubs
North East Wales Football League clubs
Ardal Leagues clubs